Robert Miracle is an American fraudster, who was sentenced to 13 years in prison in 2011, after pleading guilty to wire fraud and tax evasion, in connection with a $65m Ponzi scheme involving investment in Indonesian oilfields.

References

Living people
American fraudsters
Year of birth missing (living people)